Blanche II (9 June 1424 – 2 December 1464), was the titular Queen of Navarre between 1461 and 1464. She was the daughter of John II of Aragon and Blanche I of Navarre. She was also Princess of Asturias by marriage to Henry of Castile.

Early life

Birth 
Blanche was born on 9 June 1424 in Olite, Navarre. She was the second child and eldest daughter born to John II of Aragon, who was Duke of Montblanc at the time, and his wife, Blanche of Navarre.

Heiress of Navarre
In 1427, she, her brother Charles, and her sister Eleanor were proclaimed the rightful heirs of the kingdom of Navarre. Blanche was promised to the heir of Castile in the peace treaty between Navarre and Castile in 1436. She married Henry, Prince of Asturias (later King Henry IV of Castile) in 1440. The marriage was reputedly never consummated.

In 1453, after thirteen years, Henry sought the annulment of the marriage. An official examination confirmed the virginity of Blanche. A divorce was granted by the Pope on the grounds that some "witchcraft" had prevented Henry from consummating the marriage. After this, Blanche was sent home to Navarre, where she was imprisoned by her family: from 1462, she was under the custody of her sister. She remained childless throughout her life.

Claimant to the throne 
After the death of her brother in 1461, some dissatisfied Navarrese elements and some of the anti-Aragonese party regarded Blanche as the rightful monarch, as they had regarded Charles. They proclaimed her queen. She would have thus become Blanche II of Navarre, had not her father (who wanted to keep the government of Navarre) already had her incarcerated and thus not capable to act.

John tried to marry her to Charles, Duke of Berry, and younger brother of Louis XI of France to make an alliance, but Blanche refused, and her act irritated her father. In 1464, she came back to Pamplona with the help of its bishop Nicolas de Etchabarri, who was murdered shortly after, in order to attend the Courts of Navarre.

She died by poison in Orthez less than a month later. Both her father and her sister Eleanor are suggested to have been responsible for her death. Upon her death, her rights to Navarre were inherited by her next sister, Eleanor of Aragon, Countess of Foix, who however was their father's ally and supporter, and did not press her own claims until his death in 1479.

Ancestry

References

Sources
 

1424 births
1464 deaths
15th-century Navarrese monarchs
15th-century women rulers
People from Olite
Princesses of Asturias
Murdered royalty
Repudiated queens
Navarrese infantas
Aragonese infantas
Blanche
15th-century Spanish women
Queens regnant of Navarre
Assassinated royalty
Deaths by poisoning
Daughters of kings